The Roman Catholic Archdiocese of Zagreb is the central archdiocese of the Catholic Church in Croatia, centered in the capital city Zagreb. It is the metropolitan see of Croatia, and the present archbishop is Josip Bozanić.
It encompasses the northwestern continental areas of Croatia.

Suffragan dioceses

 Roman Catholic Diocese of Bjelovar-Križevci
 Eparchy of Križevci (Greek-Catholic)
 Roman Catholic Diocese of Sisak
 Roman Catholic Diocese of Varaždin

History
The diocese of Zagreb was founded by Saint Ladislaus I of Hungary in 1094. On November 11, 1852, it was elevated to the status of an archdiocese.

Ordinaries
Bishops
 Fancica (c. 1125/28–1131)
 Dominic (1193–1201)
 Stephen II (1225–1247)
 Philip Türje (1247–1262)
 Farkas Bejc (1262–1263; elected)
 Timothy (1263–1287)
 Anthony (1287)
 Michael Bő (1295–1303)
 Augustin Kažotić (1303–1323)
 Nicholas Vásári (1349)
 Nicholas Apáti (1350–1356)
 Paul Horvat (1379–1386)
 Thomas de Branche de Debrentha, O.S.B. (11 October 1454 – 13 January 1463)
 Nicolaus Olahus (1543–1548)
 Juraj Drašković (22 March 1564 – 27 October 1578)
 Nikola Stepanić Selnički (1598–1602)
 Miklós Zelniczey Naprady (15 December 1600 – 1604)
 Šimun Bratulić, O.S.P.P.E.  (13 September 1604 – 1611)
 Petar Domitrović (15 July 1613 – 1629)
 Franjo Ergelski Hasanović (17 December 1629 – 1642)
 Benedikt Vinković (28 April 1642 – 1643)
 Martin Bogdan (1643–1647)
 Petar Petretić (1648 – 3 August 1667)
 Martin Borković, O.S.P.P.E.  (11 June 1668 – 31 October 1687)
 Aleksandar Ignacije Mikulić Brokunovečki (11 October 1688 – 11 May 1694)
 Stjepan Seliščević (10 January 1695 – 1 April 1703)
 Márton Brajkovićs (14 January 1704 – 4 June 1708)
 Imre Esterházy, O.S.P.P.E. (9 September 1709 – 17 March 1727)
 Juraj Branjug (26 November 1727 – 28 April 1748)
 Franjo Klobusiczky (2 December 1748 – 20 Dec 1751)
 Franjo Thauszy (24 January 1752 – 11 January 1769)
 Ivan Krstitelj Paxy (10 September 1770 appointed – 20 December 1771)
 Josip Galjuf (14 December 1772 – 3 February 1786)
 Maksimilijan Vrhovac (10 March 1788 – 16 December 1827)
 Aleksandar Alagović (15 March 1830 – 18 March 1837)
Archbishops
 Juraj Haulik (2 October 1837 – 11 May 1869)
 Josip Mihalović (27 June 1870 – 19 February 1891)
 Juraj Posilović (18 May 1894 – 26 April 1914)
 Antun Bauer (26 April 1914 – 9 December 1937)
 Alojzije Stepinac (7 December 1937 – 10 February 1960)
 Franjo Šeper (5 March 1960 – 20 August 1969)
 Franjo Kuharić (16 June 1970 – 5 July 1997)
 Josip Bozanić (5 July 1997 – present)

Auxiliary Bishops
 Franjo Salis-Seewis, titular bishop of Corycus (23 April 1926 – 27 October 1967)
 Josip Lach, titular bishop of Dodona (11 December 1939 – 12 September 1983)
 Franjo Kuharić, titular bishop of Meta (15 February 1964 – 16 June 1970)
 Josip Salač, titular bishop of Baliana (16 June 1970 – 19 December 1975)
 Mijo Škvorc, S.J., titular bishop of Hadrumetum (16 June 1970 – 15 February 1989)
 Đuro Kokša, titular bishop of Grumentum (20 April 1978 – 26 November 1998)
 Juraj Jezerinac, titular bishop of Strumnitza (11 April 1991 – 25 April 1997)
 Marko Culej, titular bishop of Limata (7 January 1992 – 5 July 1997)
 Josip Mrzljak, titular bishop of Caltadria (29 December 1998 – 20 March 2007)
 Vlado Košić, titular bishop of Ruspae (29 December 1998 – 5 December 2009)
 Valentin Pozaić, S.J., titular bishop of Petina (2 February 2005 – 13 May 2017)
 Ivan Šaško, titular bishop of Rotaria (11 February 2008 – present)
 Mijo Gorski, titular bishop of Epidaurum (3 May 2010 – present)

References

1093 establishments in Europe
Roman Catholic dioceses established in the 11th century

Zagreb
Organizations based in Zagreb
Roman Catholic Archdiocese